Tricolia pullus is a species of small sea snail, a marine gastropod mollusk in the family Phasianellidae.

Subspecies
Subspecies within this species are not clearly distinguishable and are described on a geographical base. They include:
 Tricolia pullus azorica (Dautzenberg, 1889)
 Tricolia pullus canarica Nordsieck, 1973
 Tricolia pullus picta (da Costa, 1778) (synonyms: Phasianella pullus picta (da Costa, 1778); Tricolia picta (da Costa, 1778) )
 Tricolia pullus pullus (Linnaeus, 1758) (synonym: Turbo pullus pullus Linnaeus, 1758)

Description
The size of the plump, oval shell varies between 3 mm and 11 mm. The shell has five or six rounded, gently convex whorls with a smooth structure, the body whorl being the largest.  The shell has a short, abrupt spire. There is no distinct umbilicus. The aperture is roundish oval with a conspicuous operculum is thick and has a white calcareous surface.  The colour pattern of the shiny shell is very variable and goes from cream to white with pink or purple-brown spots spirally distributed in zigzag or flamed patterns.

The adults are gonochoristic, i.e. consisting of distinct males and females. The ova are released in the sea and fertilized externally.

Distribution
This species is distributed in European waters, the Mediterranean Sea, the Sea of Azov, in the Atlantic Ocean along the Canaries and in the Indian Ocean along Madagascar. It is found in the sublittoral zone and deeper waters (up to 35 m) in often abundant numbers on red seaweeds (Laurencia, Lomentaria, Mastocarpus), collecting diatoms and detritus.

References

 Dautzenberg, P. (1923). Liste préliminaire des mollusques marins de Madagascar et description de deux especes nouvelles. Journal de Conchyliologie 68: 21-74
 Vera Fretter, Some observations on Tricolia pullus (L.) and Margarites helicinus (Fabricius), J. Mollus. Stud. (1955) 31 (3-4): 159–162. 
 Backeljau, T. (1986). Lijst van de recente mariene mollusken van België [List of the recent marine molluscs of Belgium]. Koninklijk Belgisch Instituut voor Natuurwetenschappen: Brussels, Belgium. 106 pp.
 Gofas, S.; Le Renard, J.; Bouchet, P. (2001). Mollusca, in: Costello, M.J. et al. (Ed.) (2001). European register of marine species: a check-list of the marine species in Europe and a bibliography of guides to their identification. Collection Patrimoines Naturels, 50: pp. 180–213 
 Kantor Yu.I. & Sysoev A.V. (2006) Marine and brackish water Gastropoda of Russia and adjacent countries: an illustrated catalogue. Moscow: KMK Scientific Press. 372 pp. + 140 pls

External links
  Linnaeus, C. (1758). Systema Naturae per regna tria naturae, secundum classes, ordines, genera, species, cum characteribus, differentiis, synonymis, locis. Editio decima, reformata. Laurentius Salvius: Holmiae. ii, 824 pp
 
 Naturdata.com : Tricolia pullus from Portugal with photos

Phasianellidae
Gastropods described in 1758
Taxa named by Carl Linnaeus